Wiktorów  is a settlement in the administrative district of Gmina Zduńska Wola, within Zduńska Wola County, Łódź Voivodeship, in central Poland.

The settlement has a population of four.

References

Villages in Zduńska Wola County